Šoderica is a lake in northern Croatia, formed by the river Drava, near Drnje, Botovo, and Đelekovec in Koprivnica-Križevci County.

References

Lakes of Croatia
Landforms of Koprivnica-Križevci County